James Patrick Heggarty (born 4 August 1965) is a Northern Irish former professional footballer who played in the Football League for Burnley.

References
General

Specific

[[Category:1965
births]]
Living people
People from Larne
Association footballers from Northern Ireland
Association football defenders
Brighton & Hove Albion F.C. players
Burnley F.C. players
Worthing F.C. players
English Football League players
1965 births